Bophumpa Creek is a stream in Holmes County in the U.S. state of Mississippi. It is a tributary to Fannegusha Creek.

Bophumpa Creek is a name derived from the Choctaw language purported to mean either "rain creek" or "pawpaw creek". A variant name is "Sweet Water Creek".

References

Rivers of Mississippi
Rivers of Holmes County, Mississippi
Mississippi placenames of Native American origin